Father Zacarias Agatep (September 6, 1936 – October 27 1982), also known by his nickname Apo Kari, was a Roman Catholic parish priest who was killed for speaking against foreign and local monopolies in Ilocos Sur's tobacco industry during the dictatorship of President Ferdinand Marcos. He has formally been honored as a hero of democracy who fought against the dictatorship, having had his name etched on the wall of remembrance of the Philippines' Bantayog ng mga Bayani.

Advocacy work 
As the parish priest of Our Lady of Hope Parish in Caoayan, Ilocos Sur father Agatep helped organize cooperatives, taught interested farmers about land reform, and spoke against foreign and local monopolies in the tobacco industry, which formed the backbone of Ilocos Sur's economy at the time.

Arrest and release 
He was arrested for supposed "subversion" in 1980 and was incarcerated for four months until he was released as part of Marcos public relations efforts in preparation for a visit by Pope John Paul II. Upon his release, he famously wrote a letter to the President, decrying what he described as a "frame-up" and lamenting the miscarriage of justice typical under the Marcos administration.

Death 
Father Agatep kept speaking out against the abuses of the Marcos administration until he was shot four times in the back by unidentified gunmen in October 1982.

See also 
 Bantayog ng mga Bayani
 Religious sector resistance against the Marcos dictatorship

References 

Individuals honored at the Bantayog ng mga Bayani
Religious workers honored at the Bantayog ng mga Bayani
20th-century Filipino Roman Catholic priests
Filipino activists
1936 births
1982 deaths